The Carey Islands are an island group off Baffin Bay, in Avannaata municipality, northwest Greenland. Located relatively far offshore the Carey Islands are the westernmost point of Greenland as a territory. The sea surrounding the islands is clogged by ice most of the year.

Geography
The archipelago consists of six desolate islands, a few small islets and a number of rocks awash.

The nearest settlement is Moriusaq to the east on the coast of Greenland, abandoned since 2007.

Islands

Main islands
Nordvestø, Isbjørneø and Mellemø form a compact cluster at the NW end of the archipelago.
This island's western landhead is the westernmost point of Greenland.
Isbjørneø and Mellemø, lying close to the east and forming a natural harbour between them and Nordvestø. 
Fireø, lying in the southern area of the group.

Islets
Hollænderhatten and Tyreøjet are two small islets to the east of Fireø having a diameter of a few hundred metres. there are also numerous other islets and rocks, especially in the western sector of the archipelago.

Important Bird Area
The island group has been designated an Important Bird Area (IBA) by BirdLife International because it supports a breeding population of some 6,700 pairs of thick-billed murres, as well as other seabirds including glaucous gulls, razorbills, black guillemots and Atlantic puffins.

History
The islands had been inhabited by the Inuit in the past; remains of their dwellings were found by Clements Markham in August 1851.

The Carey Islands' were named by the 1616 Bylot-Baffin Arctic expedition after Allwin Carey, one of the financiers of the venture.

Swedish naturalists Alfred Björling and Evald Kallstenius stopped at the Carey Islands in 1892 during an expedition on schooner Ripple to pick up supplies at a cache there. The Ripple, however, was driven on shore and wrecked. The men attempted to sail a small sloop back to Etah, but were forced to return to the Carey Islands.

According to letters left by members of the ill-fated expedition in a cairn on the islands, the remaining four men attempted to sail their open boat 80 miles to Ellesmere Island: 

In June 1893, the crew of the Scottish whaler Aurora spotted a wreck on the Carey Islands. They found the Ripple, a man's body buried under a pile of stones, and Björling's letters. No trace of the other four men, or the small boat, was ever found.

See also
List of islands of Greenland
List of countries by westernmost point
Björling-Kallstenius Expedition
Cape Alexander, Greenland

References

External links
An ornithological survey of the Carey Islands

Islands of Greenland
Avannaata
Important Bird Areas of Greenland
Important Bird Areas of Arctic islands
Seabird colonies